Seaxburh or Sexburga is the name of the following Anglo-Saxon women:

Saint Seaxburh of Ely (died c. 699)
Seaxburh of Wessex (died c. 674)